Lennon Anne Murphy (born March 31, 1982) is an American singer, songwriter and record producer.

Early life 
Murphy, who is named after musician John Lennon, was born in Ronkonkoma, New York. When she was four years old, Murphy and her mother moved to Hendersonville, Tennessee, where she began playing piano and writing songs at the age of nine. At the age of 15, Lennon started performing shows at various local Nashville establishments. With much critical acclaim from the Nashville music community came interest from several record companies. Lennon ultimately signed to Arista Records at the age of 18.

Within days of her 18th birthday, Murphy arrived home from school to find her mother dead. The cause of death was determined to be an allergic reaction to prescription medication. Murphy fought for and eventually won custody of her then eight-year-old younger sister, Mariella.

Career 
Known in music by only her first name, she released her debut album, 5:30 Saturday Morning, from Arista records, on September 11, 2001. Her only single from that album was a song called "Brake of your Car". Soured by the experience, she left Arista, saying "I wanted a career as a rock act, and an album I could be proud of, and staying with Arista I really didn't see that happening,".

In 2004, Murphy released two albums and a DVD. One album is a strictly acoustic release entitled Career Suicide, released on September 24, 2004. Murphy accompanied herself on piano throughout the record. Most songs were remakes of songs from 5:30 Saturday Morning but the new ones were also well received. On December 27, 2004, she released another album entitled I Am. She also released a DVD entitled My Crazy Life. She released them all independently on John Galt Entertainment, a record label she founded with her manager.

On September 5, 2006, Murphy kicked off a tour opening for Aerosmith and Mötley Crüe to promote the September 19, 2006, release of her album Damaged Goods. The lead single is the track Where Do I Fit In?, which is a revamp of the track My Beautiful from her Arista debut.

In 2007, Lennon started a metal project called "Devil's Gift". Their self-titled album was produced by Jason Suecof (Trivium, DevilDriver, Chimaira).
The album was released in Europe in 2008 by Universal and in the US on October 6, 2009.

In 2010, Lennon took her first step as a record producer with work on the debut record for Camryn a 10-year-old pop act from Colorado, whose songs made up the sound track for the film Judy Moody and the Not Bummer Summer. Lennon also produced the debut album for Baccardi recording artist Surrender The Fall.

In 2014, Lennon helped create the band "It's War". Their 1st single "Heart" was released in February 2014. The five-track EP, including "Heart," dropped on iTunes, Amazon and Google Play Music on May 26, 2015.

Personal life 
Murphy resides in Orlando, Florida. She has a son (Adrien) and a dog (Mulder).

Trademark dispute with Yoko Ono 
On February 12, 2008, Yoko Ono filed a complaint against Murphy's use of her own first name. Murphy reported on her own MySpace page that she is being sued by Ono to cease use of the "Lennon" name. The news turned up because Julian Lennon picked up a letter from Murphy and published it. Murphy wrote on Feb. 8: "Yesterday I received notice that Yoko Ono had filed a lawsuit against me, asking for a cancellation of the trademark that I own for the name 'Lennon.' This could very well mean the career that I have worked so hard at, the one you all have believed in, may come to an end. I wanted to address the situation to all my fans because without you I am nothing and it's not fair to everyone who has believed in my music not to be properly informed of this pure bulls***." Murphy says in her letter that in 2003, her Arista product manager was Justin Shukat, the son of Ono's longtime attorney Peter Shukat.

Murphy says Justin went to his father and Ono "to make her aware of the use, evidently giving her blessing as Arista proceeded forward with the album release and at the same time filing for the trademark. Its [sic] takes time for all of the legal work to go through, but finally in 2003 I was granted by the United States Patent & Trademark Office the ownership in the name Lennon for musical use."

"Eight long, hard years pass and no one says a word. Just two days before the statute of limitations was up this very same lawyer we went to in 2000 filed their complaint. It accuses me of falsely representing myself and causing confusion in the market place that has damaged ... the John Lennon name."

According to Yoko Ono, Lennon Murphy sought Ono's permission to do her performances under her name. Ono did not object to her request. Subsequently, without Ono's knowledge, Murphy filed an application in the United States Patent & Trademark Office requesting the exclusive right to utilize the name "Lennon" for musical performances. Ono's attorneys asked Murphy's attorneys and manager to withdraw her registration of exclusivity to the name "Lennon" for the trademark. Ono also offered to cover all costs incurred in filing for the trademark, but Murphy went ahead to register.

In 2008, Ono stated she did not sue Murphy, but sought to stop her from getting the exclusive right to the name Lennon for performance purposes. Ono's attorneys notified the Trademark office that Ono did not believe it was fair that Murphy be granted the exclusive right to the "Lennon" trademark in relation to musical and entertainment services.

On September 23, 2008, after months of legal battle, Yoko Ono lost to Lennon Murphy after the United States Trademark Board dismissed Ono's petition.

Discography

As singer/writer

As producer/writer

References

External links 
 Lennon Murphy's official website

1982 births
Singer-songwriters from Tennessee
American rock songwriters
American rock singers
American women singer-songwriters
American women heavy metal singers
Living people
People from Ronkonkoma, New York
21st-century American singers
21st-century American women singers